Yugoslavia participated in the biennial classical music competition Eurovision Young Musicians 4 times, making their debut in 1986 and made appearances at every contest until its last in 1992.

Participation overview

See also
 Yugoslavia in the Eurovision Song Contest
 Yugoslavia in the Eurovision Young Dancers

References

External links 
 Eurovision Young Musicians

Countries in the Eurovision Young Musicians